Laura del Carmen Moreno Garza (born November 16, 1978, in Monterrey, Nuevo León) is a Mexican artistic gymnast.

References

External links
 

1978 births
Living people
Mexican female artistic gymnasts
Gymnasts at the 2004 Summer Olympics
Olympic gymnasts of Mexico